A Certified Commercial Investment Member (CCIM) is a recognized expert in the disciplines of commercial and investment real estate. The designation is awarded by the CCIM Institute, formerly known as Commercial Investment Real Estate Institute (CIREI) of the National Association of Realtors. The CCIM designation was originally established by the California Association of Realtors in 1954 under the name Certified Property Exchanger (CPE).].

A CCIM is a resource to the commercial real estate owner, investor, and user, and is among a corps of over 9,500 professionals around the globe who hold the CCIM designation. CCIM designees live and work in the U.S., Canada, Mexico, and more than 35 other nations.  International membership includes more than 1,000 professionals.

CCIMs must be proficient in the areas of investment analysis, market analysis, user decision analysis and financial analysis for commercial real estate.  In 2007, CCIM Institute launched the Robert L. Ward Center for Real Estate Studies, which offers concentrated courses on specific topics.  CCIMs have access to a suite of online technology tools through the Site To Do Business, and they can post properties for sale or lease through the online CCIMNet commercial real estate exchange.

Of the more than 150,000 commercial real estate professionals in the United States, only an estimated 6 percent hold the CCIM designation.

Qualifications
To earn the CCIM designation, one must meet the following requirements:
Complete Designation curriculum, which includes (CI 101) Financial Analysis for Commercial Investment Real Estate; (CI 102) Market Analysis for Commercial Investment Real Estate; (CI 103) User Decision Analysis for Commercial Investment Real Estate; (CI 104) Investment Analysis for Commercial Investment Real Estate; Online Ethics Course; Preparing to Negotiate or Advanced Negotiation Workshop.
Earn 2 elective credits from other sources.
Submit a portfolio of qualifying experience before taking the final exam.
Pass the Comprehensive Exam.

Commercial Investment Real Estate magazine
Commercial Investment Real Estate magazine, the CCIM Institute's flagship publication, features articles about industry trends. Authors for the bi-monthly magazine include CCIM members, industry professionals, and CCIM Institute staff.

See also
Real estate agent

References

External links 
The CCIM Institute

Commercial real estate
Professional certification in finance